LG K92 is a mid-range Android smartphone manufactured by LG Electronics, announced and released on 29 September 2020.

References 

LG Electronics smartphones
Mobile phones introduced in 2020
Android (operating system) devices
Mobile phones with multiple rear cameras